Robert Charles O'Brien Jr. (born June 18, 1966) is an American attorney who served as the 27th United States national security advisor from 2019 to 2021. He was the fourth and final person to hold the position during the presidency of Donald Trump.

Early life and education
O'Brien was born in Los Angeles and raised in Santa Rosa, California, where he attended Cardinal Newman High School. He won a Rotary scholarship to study at the University of the Free State in South Africa in 1987. He received a Bachelor of Arts in political science from the University of California, Los Angeles in 1988, and a Juris Doctor from the UC Berkeley School of Law in 1991.

Early career 
From 1996 to 1998, O'Brien was a legal officer with the United Nations Compensation Commission in Geneva, Switzerland. O'Brien was a major in the Judge Advocate General's Corps of the United States Army Reserve.

Private practice
O'Brien was the California managing partner of the law firm Arent Fox LLP for seven years.

O'Brien was a founding partner, along with former federal judge Stephen Larson, of the Los Angeles boutique law firm Larson O'Brien LLP, which they established in January 2016. O'Brien retired from the firm when he was appointed National Security Advisor.

George W. Bush and Obama administrations

O'Brien was nominated by President George W. Bush as the U.S. alternate representative to the 60th session of the United Nations General Assembly during 2005–06.

O'Brien was co-chairman of the U.S. Department of State's Public-Private Partnership for Justice Reform in Afghanistan, launched in December 2007, which "promoted the rule of law" in Afghanistan by training judges, prosecutors, and defense attorneys. He continued this role during the first term of the Obama administration.

On July 31, 2008, President Bush announced his intention to appoint O'Brien to serve in his administration as a member of the Cultural Property Advisory Committee, an advisory committee on issues involving antiquities and cultural matters, for the remainder of a three-year term which expired on April 25, 2011.

Mitt Romney 2012 campaign 
In October 2011, O'Brien was named to Mitt Romney's advisory team as co-chair of the International Organizations Work Group.

2016 presidential election 
Later, in May 2015, he became an adviser on foreign policy and national security affairs for Wisconsin Governor Scott Walker's presidential campaign. After Walker left the race, O'Brien advised Ted Cruz's campaign. During the time he advised Ted Cruz's presidential campaign, he claimed: "It's clear that Vladimir Putin just doesn't like [Hillary Clinton], and is going to do what he can to help Donald Trump."

Trump administration (2017–2019)

In 2017, O'Brien was under consideration by the Donald Trump administration to serve as Secretary of the Navy. The Orange County Register editorial board endorsed O'Brien to serve in this position, stating, "He is the ideal candidate to ensure American global dominance continues—in a way that fits both the present national mood and our enduring national values." Later in the administration, O'Brien advocated publicly for a larger Navy and visited several U.S. shipyards.

From May 25, 2018 to October 3, 2019, O'Brien served as the Special Presidential Envoy for Hostage Affairs. He was given the rank of ambassador one year after his appointment. He attended the trial of the American rapper ASAP Rocky in Stockholm, Sweden and told reporters "The president sent me here, so it's totally appropriate. I also help free people that are held by governments, so unjustly detained Americans." O'Brien had written the Swedish government warning of "negative consequences" if the case was not resolved.

In this capacity, he "helped secure the 2018 release of American pastor Andrew Brunson, whose two-year imprisonment in Turkey heightened tensions between Washington and Ankara." O'Brien was also involved in obtaining the release of Danny Burch, an American oil worker held in Yemen for a year, and who ultimately received an Oval Office meeting with President Trump.

National Security Advisor

Appointment 
O'Brien took office as the 27th United States National Security Advisor on September 18, 2019. President Trump appointed O'Brien to succeed John Bolton, who resigned earlier that month. A few days later, O'Brien announced that Matthew Pottinger would become the deputy national security advisor, replacing Charles Kupperman in that role. O'Brien was seen as a traditional foreign policy conservative rather than a firebrand.

Early in his tenure, O'Brien accompanied Vice President Mike Pence to meet Turkish President Recep Erdogan in efforts to achieve a ceasefire between Turkey and Kurdish forces in Syria after the U.S. abruptly withdrew military forces that stood between Turkish and Kurdish forces.

In December 2019, O'Brien defended Trump's decision to pardon Navy SEAL Eddie Gallagher, who was accused by several fellow Navy SEAL members of his platoon of shooting unarmed civilians who posed no threat and of murdering an injured 17-year-old ISIS fighter, but who was convicted of only "wrongfully posing for an unofficial picture with a human casualty".

After the Trump administration's strike against Qasem Soleimani, the head of the Iranian Islamic Revolutionary Guard Corps and commander of its Quds Force, O'Brien defended the intelligence the administration used to justify the killing, arguing that Soleimani had been planning attacks on U.S. military and diplomatic installations in Iraq and elsewhere in the Middle East.

The National Security Council under O'Brien took a greater focus on China, and he aligned himself with Peter Navarro, a fellow hardliner on China. He threatened sanctions against China if it moved to pass a national security law that pro-democracy activists believed would undermine freedom in Hong Kong. O'Brien also criticized China for its actions amid territorial disputes in the South China Sea, and oversaw an increase in U.S. and allied military activity intended to guarantee freedom of navigation. O'Brien criticized China's government, saying in a speech that "The Chinese Communist Party is Marxist-Leninist," and "The party General Secretary Xi Jinping sees himself as Josef Stalin’s successor." In the same speech, he asserted: "Together with our allies and partners, we will resist the Chinese Communist Party's efforts to manipulate our people and our governments, damage our economies, and undermine our sovereignty."

When many other intelligence officials who had been involved in briefing Trump on national security characterized Trump as inattentive, O'Brien disputed the characterization, saying Trump was "laser-focused on the issues at hand and asks probing questions throughout the briefings — it reminds me of appearing before a well-prepared appellate judge and defending the case."

In May 2020, after the murder of George Floyd by Minneapolis police, O'Brien rejected that there was systemic racism in U.S. police forces.

In an article published on July 12, 2020, three weeks after the release of his predecessor's book The Room Where It Happened, O'Brien defended Trump's record on China, stating that "the United States continues to stand against [the Chinese Communist Party’s coercive population-control policies] policies, especially as they are aimed at the Uighurs."

COVID-19 pandemic
O'Brien was involved in early deliberations about reacting to the COVID-19 pandemic. He advised Trump to halt travel from Europe, disagreeing with Trump's Treasury Secretary. According to Washington Post reporter Bob Woodward, O'Brien counseled Trump that, “This will be the biggest national security threat you face in your presidency...This is going to be the roughest thing you face.”

O'Brien was blunt in condemning China for its role in the pandemic, telling NBC News: "The cover-up that they did of the virus is going to go down in history along with Chernobyl."

An official announced on July 27, 2020, that O'Brien had been diagnosed with COVID-19. White House officials announced that O'Brien was experiencing "mild symptoms" and is "self-isolating and working from a secure location off site".

Controversy over Russian disinformation efforts
Brian Murphy, who was acting chief of intelligence at the Department of Homeland Security from March 2018 until August 2020, alleged that he was instructed "to cease providing intelligence assessments on the threat of Russian interference in the United States, and instead start reporting on interference activities by China and Iran." Chad Wolf, who was acting secretary of the Department of Homeland Security, alleged that Robert O'Brien had the assessments of Russian interference suppressed. John Cohen, who was under secretary of intelligence at the Department of Homeland Security during Barack Obama's presidency, stated "By blocking information from being released that describes threats facing the nation... undermines the ability of the public and state and local authorities to work with the federal government to counteract the threat."

Kosovo-Serbia talks
A summit at the White House between Kosovo and Serbia was organized by Richard Grenell and scheduled for September 3 and 4, 2020. Grenell, along with O'Brien, cohosted the talks. On September 4, the agreements were signed by Serbian President Aleksandar Vučić and Kosovo Prime Minister Avdullah Hoti. The signing ceremony took place in the Oval Office at the White House in the presence of US President Donald Trump on September 4, 2020. Kosovo awarded O'Brien the Presidential Medal of Merit for his work on the effort.

Abraham Accords
O'Brien was in office when the United States brokered the Abraham Accords, which established peace agreements and diplomatic relations between Israel and the United Arab Emirates, and later included Bahrain, Morocco, Oman, and Sudan. In August 2020, O'Brien said that President Trump should be eligible for the Nobel Peace Prize after the initial peace agreement between Israel and the United Arab Emirates. O'Brien served as part of a U.S.-Israeli delegation on the first commercial flight from Israel to the UAE on August 31, 2020. The UAE and Israel moved to establish full diplomatic ties after Israel agreed to suspend a plan to annex parts of the occupied West Bank. On September 11 a new peace agreement was by the administration between Bahrain and Israel. O'Brien had advocated for other Arab and Muslim countries to join the accords. Trump awarded O'Brien the National Security Medal for his role in achieving the peace agreement.

Other

On November 16, 2020, O'Brien agreed to cooperation with President-elect Joe Biden's power transition. In December 2020, O'Brien explained in an interview that the China "absolutely could have done more" when it came to COVID-19 and that "the Chinese loss of credibility will be very difficult for them to overcome".

On June 9, 2022, O’Brien was awarded the rank of  chevalier in the Legion d’honneur by French President Emanuel Macron in recognition for his achievements as the national security advisor, and for his assistance in helping to rescue two French hostages kidnapped abroad.

Political future 

Some commentators have speculated about O'Brien's future in politics after the Trump administration, including speculation he could be a candidate for president in 2024. In response, O'Brien has stated that he is "fully focused on my current job", but added:"I’m not going to make a Shermanesque statement about never running under any circumstances, but I’m focused on implementing the president’s agenda, and getting the foreign policy picture for the American people, and that’s all I’m focused on."In response to reports of him considering a 2024 bid, former Republican National Committee (RNC) chair Michael Steele questioned his viability given his lack of name recognition or distinct electoral niche. An article published in The American Conservative suggested that O'Brien's reported presidential aspirations are a way to build his stature for a future appointment as Secretary of State or Secretary of Defense.

He has been referred to as a "dark horse 2024 contender," and ahead of 2022 midterm elections advised candidates in foreign affairs and participated in fundraising efforts. Some have speculated that as a Mormon, he might have an advantage in western state Republican primaries. One journalist observed: "O’Brien remains in Trump’s good graces, as well as staying in good standing in Washington’s foreign policy community."

In July 2022, O’Brien was elected chairman of the board of directors of the Richard Nixon Foundation, an educational nonprofit organization that operates the Richard Nixon Presidential Library and Museum founded by former President Richard Nixon.

Personal life
Raised a Catholic, O'Brien converted to the Church of Jesus Christ of Latter-day Saints in his twenties. His wife, Lo-Mari O'Brien, is of Afrikaner descent, and Robert C. O'Brien is reportedly fluent in Afrikaans. The couple raised three children: Margaret, Robert and Lauren. His son Robert died in an accidental drowning in 2015.

Books
O'Brien is the author of the 2016 book While America Slept: Restoring American Leadership to a World in Crisis. Writing in Foreign Policy, Daniel Runde said, "While America Slept is the 2016 equivalent of Richard Nixon's The Real War." A former colleague from the George W. Bush administration, Runde summarized O'Brien's views as follows: 
In The Hill, Bart Marcois, a retired foreign service officer, wrote, "If you're wondering what trends and events will drive President-elect Donald Trump's foreign policy, you need to read While America Slept, by Robert O'Brien."

Other reviews were more critical. Alex Ward, the associate director in the Atlantic Council's Brent Scowcroft Center on International Security, noted that "O'Brien's book is frustrating because it starts with the assumption that all of Obama's foreign policy choices are bad and assumes the reader believes this as well...[H]is analysis, while passionately and decently argued, missed the bigger picture through the partisan fog." The book is broadly critical of the Obama administration's security and foreign policies.

While National Security Advisor, O'Brien edited the manuscript "Trump on China: Putting America First," which was a compilation of speeches about China by senior administration officials.

See also

References

External links

State Department Cultural Property Advisory Committee
Arent Fox listing for O'Brien

1966 births
20th-century American lawyers
21st-century American lawyers
California Republicans
Converts to Mormonism
Former Roman Catholics
Latter Day Saints from California
Lawyers from Los Angeles
Living people
Military personnel from California
People from Santa Rosa, California
UC Berkeley School of Law alumni
United States National Security Advisors
United States Special Envoys
University of California, Los Angeles alumni